Vadym Kuvakin (born 4 May 1984) is a Ukrainian gymnast. He competed at the 2004 Summer Olympics.

References

External links
 

1984 births
Living people
Ukrainian male artistic gymnasts
Olympic gymnasts of Ukraine
Gymnasts at the 2004 Summer Olympics
Sportspeople from Kherson
21st-century Ukrainian people